Sassi Punnuh or Sassui Punhun  is a love story from Punjabi, Sindhi, and Balochi folklore. The story is about a faithful lover who will endure any difficulty while seeking her beloved husband who was separated from her by rivals.

The story also appears in Shah Jo Risalo and forms part of seven popular tragic romances from Sindh, Pakistan. The other six tales are Umar Marvi, Sohni Mehar, Lilan Chanesar, Noori Jam Tamachi, Sorath Rai Diyach, and Momal Rano commonly known as the Seven Queens of Sindh, or the Seven heroines of Shah Abdul Latif Bhittai.

Punnu 
Mir Punnhun Khan (Mir Dostein) was the son of Mir Aalii or Ari, a baloch king of Kech, Balochistan.

Sassi 
Sassi was the daughter of the Raja of Bhambore in Sindh (now in Pakistan). Upon Sassi's birth, astrologers predicted that she was a bane on the royal family's honour. The Raja ordered that the child be put in a wooden box and thrown in the Sindhu. A washerman of the Bhambore village found the wooden box and the child inside. The washerman believed the child was a blessing from God and took her home. As he had no children of his own, he decided to adopt her.

Sassi grew up to be as beautiful as the fairies of heaven. Stories of her beauty reached Punnu and he became desperate to meet Sassi. The handsome young Prince therefore travelled to Bhambore. He sent his clothes to Sassi's father (a washerman) so that he could catch a glimpse of Sassi. When he visited the washerman's house, they fell in love at first sight. Sassi's father was dispirited, hoping that Sassi would marry a washerman and no one else. He asked Punnu to prove that he was worthy of Sassi by passing the test as a washerman. Punnu agreed to prove his love. While washing, he tore all the clothes as, being a prince, he had never washed any clothes; he thus failed the agreement. But before he returned those clothes, he hid gold coins in the pockets of all the clothes, hoping this would keep the villagers quiet. The trick worked, and Sassi's father agreed to the marriage.

Punnu's brothers
Punnu's father and brothers were against his marriage to Sassi (Punnu being a prince and she being a washerman's daughter) and so, for their father's sake, Punnu's brothers travelled to Bhambore. First they threatened Punnu but when he didn't relent, they tried more devious methods. Punnu was surprised to see his brothers supporting his marriage and on the first night, they pretended to enjoy and participate in the marriage celebrations and forced Punnu to drink different types of wines. When he was intoxicated they carried him on a camel's back and returned to their hometown of Kech.

The lovers meet their end 

When Sassi woke up the following morning, she realized that she was cheated by her brothers-in-law. She became mad with the grief of separation from her beloved and ran barefoot towards the town of Kech Makran. To reach it, she had to cross miles of desert. Alone, she continued her journey until her feet were blistered and her lips were parched from crying "Punnhun, Punnhun!". The journey was full of dangerous hazards. She was thirsty, when she saw a shepherd coming out of a hut. He gave her some water to drink. Seeing her incredible beauty, he tried to force himself on Sassi. Sassi escaped and prayed to God to hide her. God listened to her prayers, land shook and split and Sassi found herself buried in the valley of mountains. When Punhun woke in Makran he could not stop himself from running back to Bhambore. On the way he called out "Sassi, Sassi!" to which the shepherd told Punnhun the whole story. Punnhun also lamented the same prayer, the land shook and split again and he was also buried in the same mountain valley as Sassi. The legendary grave still exists in this valley. Shah Abdul Latif Bhittai sings this historic tale in his Sufi poetry as an example of eternal love and union with divine. But according to the famous tale by Hashim (poet) (Hashim Shah) Sassi dies while crossing the desert.

Kech Makran
The Kech Makran is located along the Makran Coastal Highway in Baluchistan, Pakistan. The fort of Punnhun whose construction dates back to 6000-8000
BC is located there.

Tombs of Sassi Punnhun
Sassi and Punnu's alleged graves are located near Lasbela, Balochistan, 45 miles west of Karachi.

In popular culture

Films 
The folk tale has been filmed many times including:

 Sassi Punnu (1928), Indian silent film by Harshadrai Sakerlal Mehta; starring Master Vithal and Zebunissa.
Sassi Punnu (1932), Indian Hindi-language film by S. R. Apte and Chimanlal Luhar; starring Eiden Bai and Haider Bandi.
Sassi Punnu (1946), Indian Hindi-language film by Jagatrai Pesumal Advani; starring Eddie Billimoria and Geeta Nizami.
Sassi Punnu (1958), Pakistani Sindhi-language film directed by Akbar Ali, produced by Syed A. Haroon.
Sassi Punho (1960), Indian Sindhi-language film directed by Ram Rasila.
Sassi Punnu (1965), Indian Punjabi-language film by Shanti Prakash Bakshi.
 Sassi Punnu (1983), Indian Punjabi-language film directed by Satish Bhakhri, starring Satish Kaul and Bhavana Bhatt.
 Sassi Punno (2004), Pakistani Urdu film directed by Hassan Askari.

Music 
The British musician Panjabi MC references the tale of Sassi in his 2003 song Jogi. The "King of Qawali", Ustad Nusrat Fateh Ali Khan, mentions Sassi in a verse of one of his most famous songs Tum Ek Gorak Dhanda Ho written by the poet Naz Khialvi. The Pakistani singer-songwriter Bilal Saeed  also mentions Sassi in his song 12 Saal.

Literature 
Sasui Puno is a play written in Sindhi by Indian writer Ram Panjwani.

See also

Tomb paintings of Sindh
Trilok Singh Chitarkar, created a beautiful painting of Sassui Punnhun in 1954
Sri Charitropakhyan

References

External links
Sassui and Punhun in Sindhi
Susuee and Punhoon in English
Sur Sassui narrated in Shah Jo Risalo
Sassui Punhun: Elsa Kazi
Sassi Punnu in Punjabi 
Love stories
Fictional duos
Punjabi folklore
Sindhi folklore
Sindhi people
Shah Jo Risalo
Pakistani folklore
Pakistani literature
Indian folklore
Indian literature